Leonel Enríque Quiñónez Padilla, known as Leonel Quiñónez (born 3 July 1993) is an Ecuadorian footballer who plays as a defender for Ecuadorian club Barcelona S.C.

His goal on 19 August 2019 from approximately 70 meters out against CD Universidad Católica went viral and was among the 11 nominees for the 2020 FIFA Puskás Award. He became the first Ecuadorian footballer to be nominated for this award.

International career
In 2020 he was called up to the Ecuador national team by manager Gustavo Alfaro, but did not make an appearance. He made his debut on 29 March 2021 in a friendly against Bolivia.

Honours

Club
Macará
 Serie B: 2016

References

External links
 
 
 

Living people
1993 births
Ecuadorian footballers
Ecuador international footballers
Association football defenders
C.D. Quevedo footballers
C.S.D. Macará footballers
Barcelona S.C. footballers
L.D.U. Quito footballers
Ecuadorian Serie A players
Ecuadorian Serie B players
Sportspeople from Esmeraldas, Ecuador